Magrane is a town and commune, and capital of Magrane District, in El Oued Province, Algeria. According to the 2008 census it has a population of 24,577, up from 20,102 in 1998, with an annual growth rate of 2.1%.

Climate

Magrane has a hot desert climate (Köppen climate classification BWh), with very hot summers and mild winters. Rainfall is light and sporadic, and summers are particularly dry.

Education

3.9% of the population has a tertiary education, and another 11.1% has completed secondary education. The overall literacy rate is 77.8%, and is 84.2% among males and 70.9% among females.

Localities
The commune of Magrane is composed of nine localities:

Magrane
Hamadine
Menanaa
Oum Zbed
Bellila
Layaaïcha
Gottaï
Ladhaya
Lekhsime

References

Neighbouring towns and cities

Communes of El Oued Province
Algeria
Cities in Algeria